Murray Alexander Armstrong  (January 1, 1916 – December 8, 2010) was a Canadian professional ice hockey centre and National Collegiate Athletic Association (NCAA) ice hockey Head Coach.

Playing career
Armstrong played junior hockey with the Regina Pats before debuting with the Toronto Maple Leafs of the National Hockey League (NHL) in the 1937–38 season. Two years later he was involved in one of the biggest trades of the decade. He, Busher Jackson, Buzz Boll, and Doc Romnes were sent to the New York Americans in exchange for Sweeney Schriner. He played three years with New York before World War II, in which he went to play and coach for the Regina Army Caps. Following his army service, Armstrong was signed by Jack Adams in Detroit, but halfway through his third season he was demoted after Adams called up an 18-year-old named Gordon Howe. In 270 career NHL games, Armstrong scored 67 goals and 121 assists for 188 points.

Following his retirement, Armstrong went on to coach the Regina Pats from 1950–55, and the University of Denver from 1956 to 1977, winning five NCAA Championships, in 1958, 1960, 1961, 1968 and 1969. He is considered one of the top NCAA coaches of all time.

He retired to St. Augustine, Florida, where he remained an avid golfer into his 90s.

His son Rob Armstrong is a former CBS News journalist and the current Retired Professional in Residence at Flagler College.

He died in St. Augustine, Florida on December 8, 2010.

Awards and achievements
EAHL Second All-Star Team (1936)
Herman W. Paterson Cup (USHL - MVP) (1947)
Lester Patrick Trophy (1977)
Hobey Baker Legends of College Hockey Award (1984)

Career statistics

Head coaching record

College

See also
List of college men's ice hockey coaches with 400 wins

References

External links
 

1916 births
2010 deaths
Canadian Army personnel of World War II
Canadian military personnel from Saskatchewan
Brooklyn Americans players
Buffalo Bisons (AHL) players
Canadian expatriate ice hockey players in the United States
Canadian ice hockey centres
Dallas Texans (USHL) players
Denver Pioneers men's ice hockey coaches
Detroit Red Wings players
Ice hockey people from Saskatchewan
International-American Hockey League players
Lester Patrick Trophy recipients
New York Americans players
New York Rovers players
Regina Pats players
Syracuse Stars (AHL) players
Toronto Maple Leafs players